Shelekhovsky District is an administrative district, one of the thirty-three in Irkutsk Oblast, Russia. Municipally, it is incorporated as Shelekhovsky Municipal District. It is located in the south of the oblast. Its administrative center is the town of Shelekhov. Population:  11,836 (2002 Census).

Administrative and municipal status
Within the framework of administrative divisions, Shelekhovsky District is one of the thirty-three in the oblast. The town of Shelekhov serves as its administrative center. As a municipal division, the district is incorporated as Shelekhovsky Municipal District.

References

Notes

Sources

Registry of the Administrative-Territorial Formations of Irkutsk Oblast 

Districts of Irkutsk Oblast
